Eifelstraße is an interchange station on the Cologne Stadtbahn lines 12, 15, and 16, located in the Cologne district of Innenstadt. The station is located at Eifelstraße on the Cologne Ring.

See also 
 List of Cologne KVB stations

External links 
 station info page 

Cologne KVB stations
Innenstadt, Cologne